Lake Ballard is an ephemeral salt lake in the Shire of Menzies, Goldfields-Esperance area of Western Australia, with its eastern end about  north of Menzies.

Sculptures
In 2003, to commemorate the 50th anniversary of the Perth International Arts Festival the Inside Australia exhibition was commissioned. Each sculpture represented a local resident of Menzies, derived from the laser scans of the town's residents. The statues were to be removed at the conclusion of the festival but remain as a tourist exhibition. It is the largest outdoor art gallery on earth.

Banded stilts
The lake is used as a breeding site for banded stilts following major flood events. The stilts nest in large close-packed colonies on low islands in ephemeral inland salt lakes such as Lake Eyre, Lake Barlee and Lake Ballard. The last recorded nesting on the lake was in 1995 following the aftermath of Cyclone Bobby.

See also

 List of lakes of Western Australia

References 

Ballard
Ballard
Ballard
Important Bird Areas of Western Australia
Tourist attractions in Western Australia
Shire of Menzies